Natalia Theodoridou is a Greek interactive fiction writer and scholar. He was the fiction editor at sub-Q, an interactive fiction magazine. The magazine entered indefinite hiatus starting August of 2020. He also has a PhD in Religious Studies to Media & Cultural Studies and has graduated from Clarion West Writers Workshop, an intensive writing program.

Theodoridou's "The Birding: A Fairy Tale", published in Strange Horizons, was the winner of the 2018 World Fantasy Award for short fiction works. It is about a plague that turns nearly everyone in the world into birds. The work was also turned into a podcast format.

Awards 
Fulbright Scholar, 2008–10
Greek Scientific Society Award, 2003
MA Studentship (Drama & Theatre Department, Royal Holloway University of London), 2007–2008
Ouseley Memorial Scholarship, 2011–13
Scholarship by the Greek State Scholarship Foundation (IKY) for undergraduate studies, 2002–2005
SOAS Research Scholarship 2010–13, & Additional Award for Fieldwork, 2010

Bibliography

Poetry 

 "Blackmare" (2013)
 "Pretty Half-Breeds, for Free" (2014)
 "Ex Machina" (2014)
 "Philomela in Seven Movements" (2015)
 "An Inventory of Ghosts" (2015)

Short fiction 
Select short stories that have been nominated for awards

References 

Living people
Year of birth missing (living people)
Fantasy writers
Speculative fiction writers
Interactive fiction writers
Greek editors
Greek women editors
Greek writers
Greek women writers
Greek women short story writers
Greek women poets
21st-century short story writers
21st-century poets
The Magazine of Fantasy & Science Fiction people
World Fantasy Award winners